This list lists the representative offices of Somaliland. Somaliland is a de facto independent republic, but its independence remains unrecognised by any country or international organisation.  All countries recognise Somaliland as part of Somalia. The government of Somaliland maintains informal ties with some foreign governments and has a small network of representative offices abroad. These missions do not have formal diplomatic status under the provisions of the Vienna Convention on Diplomatic Relations.

Africa

 Djibouti City (Representative office)

 Cairo (Representative office, to open)

 Addis Ababa (Representative office)
 
 Nairobi (Representative office)

 Juba (Representative office)

Americas

 Ottawa (Representative office)

 Washington, D.C. (Representative office)

Asia

 Riyadh (Representative office)

 Taipei (Representative office)

 Ankara (Representative office)

 Abu Dhabi (Representative office)

 Sanaa (Representative office)

Europe

 Brussels (Representative office)

 Paris (Representative office)

 Amsterdam (Representative office)

 Oslo (Representative office)

 Stockholm (Representative office)

 London (Representative office)

Oceania

 Canberra (Representative office)

See also
Foreign relations of Somaliland
List of diplomatic missions in Somaliland

References

External links
 Somaliland Government

Foreign relations of Somaliland
Somaliland
Diplomatic missions
Somaliland